Pettitoes may refer to:
pig's trotters 
Aunt Pettitoes, a character in Beatrix Potter's The Tale of Pigling Bland